Spirits’ Homecoming (Korean: 귀향) is a 2016 South Korean period drama film written and directed by Cho Jung-rae. It was released in South Korea on February 24, 2016. Production of the film was halted several times due to financial issues, but was revived with additional 75,200 people contributing to the production fund. The screening date was delayed due to the lack of theaters willing to show the film. However, people bought tickets in advance and issued petitions for the movie to be screened in more cinemas. The first screening was March 1, the Anniversary of the Samil Independence Movement.

Plot
The film is set during the Japanese occupation of Korea in 1943 telling the story of 14-year old Jung-min and 16-year old Young-hee. Jung-min's family is poor due to frequent warfare but lives happily and peacefully. Young-hee's parents died during the war so she has to take care of her younger brothers. One day, Japanese soldiers forcibly take the two girls from their homes, giving them just minutes to say goodbye and pack their clothes, ship them to Manchuria in wagons for livestock and use them as so called 'comfort women' (pejoratively referred to in South Korea as 'Homecoming Women') forcing them to perform sexual service to the soldiers of the Imperial Army.

From now on, Young-hee, Jung-min, and the others must only use Japanese since speaking any other languages is punishable. In the brothel, the girls are each given only a tiny room with a bed and an endless flow of soldiers coming for 10 minutes each. The servicemen mistreat them and beat them. Many have sadistic tendencies. 'Comfort women' are trying to cope with their situation, while some lose their sanity while others try to stay sane. One of the soldiers treats Jung-min well and gives her a map. Jung-min, Young-hee and four others plan to escape because of the constant sexual assaults and beatings. However, one of them gets lost in the dark. The Japanese catch her and severely beat her up. Jung-min and Young-hee witness that from a hideout and decide to return in order for the other girls not to be killed.
During the night, Japanese soldiers torture the 'comfort women'. In the morning they order the escaped girl, the one that got insane, and several injured ones in a lorry promising medical treatment in a bigger camp. However, in reality the servicemen kill them and burn their corpses. Later, China and Soviet Union starts a counter-attack and the Japanese decide to kill all the girls at exactly the same place of previous executions burn their corps in an incinerator. Jung-min gives Young-hee her personal talisman and asks her to obey the orders, but the girls are saved just in time by Korean Guerillas.

Young-hee and Jung-min happily escape the massacre holding hands. As they walk in tall grass, a wounded Japanese soldier tries to kill them with his sword, but he is shot by guerillas. They take the girls with them, yet the dying Japanese soldier shoots Jung-min, while Young-hee returns home and lives a long life.

The secondary plotline shows an elderly woman who has been a 'comfort woman' in her youth. She sews talismans for sale and does not want to remember those days. As some former military sexual slaves start to speak up, she decides to go public with her story, too. She comes to a government office, but the officials mistreat her: they vocally express their disgust towards the victims.
The former 'comfort woman' makes friends with her old friend's young disciple (the friend is a shaman herself). The disciple is a medium and is able to channel the spirits of the dead to their loved ones. The old woman asks the girl to call her 'grandmother' and they visit her hometown together, although 'grandmother' is upset as everything she remembers has changed. Meanwhile, the shaman's disciple channels the spirit of Jung-min and elderly Young-hee experiences the events of her adolescence again.
The disciple starts a homecoming ritual for the spirits of 'comfort women' killed by the Japanese. The spirit of Jung-min returns to her parents' house and the whole family has a simple feast.

Cast
Kang Ha-na as Jung-min 
Choi Ri as Eun-kyung 
Son Sook as Young-ok (Young-hee) 
Seo Mi-ji as Young-hee
Oh Ji-hye as Jung-min's mother
Baek Su-ryun as Song-hee 
Cha Soon-hyeong as Yoshimi
Hong Sena
Jung In-gi as Jung-min's father
 Nam Sang-ji as Zhao Fei

Background 
The director, Cho Jung-rae got the inspiration for the movie from a painting by Kang Il-chul. As a young girl, she was abused by the Japanese soldiers as a 'Comfort Woman'. The drawing shows a situation she has experienced herself: Japanese soldiers pull the 'Comfort Women' who are suffering from diseases or weaknesses to the incinerator and shoot them. The soldiers then set the dead bodies on fire to destroy any proof of what they have done to the girls. Kang Il-chul drew the picture during a psychological treatment session. Through his movie, director Cho Jung-rae wants to reach the 'Comfort Women' who cannot go back to their hometowns and wants to console the damaged memories of the old 'Comfort Women'.

Release

Reception

Hug-together campaign 
Jo entertainment, the production company of the movie, is advertising the 'Hug-Together Campaign'. This campaign is held to cure the hurt and mental pain of former 'Comfort Women' by giving a warm and big hug. It is also pertinent to the modern people who suffer in their lives, work hard and have a wounded heart that needs a warm embrace.

Awards and nominations

References

External links

South Korean drama films
2016 drama films
Films set in Korea under Japanese rule
Films about comfort women
2010s South Korean films